Sukhwinder Singh (born 12 March 1983) is an Indian professional footballer who played as a midfielder for Mohammedan in the I-League 2nd Division.

Career 
Born in Nawanshahr, Punjab, Sukhwinder started his football journey with Mahilpur Football Club before joining the Academy of JCT[1] before being promoted to their senior team .[1] He scored his first professional goal for the club on 2006 against Mahindra United in the 64th minute to help JCT to a huge 7–1 victory.[3] He then scored his second goal for the club on 11 October 2007 against Mohammedan in the 45th minute to help JCT to a 2–0 win.[4] He had a productive Durand Cup campaign in his debut season, where JCT reached the semi-finals, with Sukhwinder scoring thrice during the tournament.

References

External links 
 
 
 Player profile at Goal.com
 Player profile at eurosport.com

1983 births
Living people
People from Nawanshahr
Indian footballers
Mahindra United FC players
Chirag United Club Kerala players
Pune FC players
East Bengal Club players
Association football midfielders
Footballers from Punjab, India
I-League players
India international footballers